Benjamin Thomas Biggs (October 1, 1821 – December 25, 1893) was an American slave owner, farmer and politician from Middletown in New Castle County, Delaware. He was a veteran of the Mexican–American War and a member of the Democratic Party, who served as U.S. Representative and 46th Governor of Delaware.

Early life and family
Biggs was born near Bohemia Manor in Cecil County, Maryland, son of John and Diana Bell Biggs. He attended the Methodist Pennington Seminary in Pennington, New Jersey and Wesleyan University in Middletown, Connecticut. During the Mexican–American War he was appointed a major of the Delaware militia. He married Mary Beekman and had five children: John, Elizabeth, Benjamin T. Jr., Jennie, and Willard. They lived at 210 North Cass Street in Middletown, Delaware and were members of the Methodist Church.

Professional and political career
Biggs was a teacher and a farmer, whose time was primarily spent tending peach orchards in central New Castle County and the adjacent portion of Maryland. However, he was also a talented public speaker, and through this avocation, began a lifelong involvement in public affairs. Beginning as a member of the Whig Party, he was an instrumental figure in the Delaware Constitutional Convention of 1852. While the work of this convention was ultimately rejected, Biggs switched his partisan allegiance to the Democratic Party when the Whig Party broke up. The Democrats were the Southern leaning, anti-abolitionist, states rights party, strongly opposed to the policies of Abraham Lincoln and the Republicans. Presumably Biggs was in general agreement with its positions.

United States Congress

Biggs was the Democratic candidate for the U.S. House in the 1860 election, but was narrowly defeated by the People's Party candidate, George P. Fisher. The People's Party was a local coalition of the Republicans and Constitutional Union Party, and the positions of people, like Fisher, on the great issues of the day were not yet clear. By 1868 they were, and after Delaware had experienced Federal supervision of its polling places, and the forced emancipation of its few slaves, a large majority turned permanently to the candidates of the Democratic Party. When Biggs ran again for the U.S. House, he was easily elected, defeating Republican Alfred T. Torbert in the 1868 election, and Joshua T. Heald in the 1870 election. But popularity in Delaware did not result in anything useful in the U.S. House, as Biggs joined a small and powerless minority in the 41st and 42nd Congress. He served two terms, from March 4, 1869, until March 3, 1873, during the administration of U.S. President Ulysses S. Grant and then retired, back to his peach orchards.

Governor of Delaware
Over the next twenty years Delaware politics were not unlike those of a state in the Deep South. In spite of a large minority of Republicans in New Castle County, hatred of the Republicans and their policies of racial equality ran high throughout the rest of the state. There were years when the Republicans were unable to elect anyone to the General Assembly and years when they did not even bother to nominate a candidate for governor.

Biggs was nominated to run for governor in 1886, and fortunately for him, it was the last year such a disparity existed between the parties. For the last time there was no Republican candidate, and he received only the token opposition of the Temperance Reform Party candidate, James R. Hoffecker, whom he defeated easily. Biggs served from January 18, 1887, until January 20, 1891. Two years later the Republicans began their long road back and took advantage of splits in the Democratic leadership to elect a small majority in the state House. Meanwhile, Biggs did as countless governors before him, and pleaded with the General Assembly for all kinds of reform, including better representation for New Castle County, and reform of the voting procedures. And as usual, he was largely ignored, except for a provision to establish a State Hospital for the Insane, now the Delaware State Hospital at Farnhurst.

Death and legacy
Biggs died at his home in Middletown, Delaware, and was buried in the Bethel Church Cemetery at  Chesapeake City, Maryland. His remains were moved again to an unknown location in 1965 upon a widening of the nearby Chesapeake and Delaware Canal. His son, John, was Attorney General of Delaware while he was governor.  The Gov. Benjamin T. Biggs Farm was listed on the National Register of Historic Places in 1987.

Almanac
Elections are held on the Tuesday after the first Monday of November. The governor takes office the third Tuesday in January, and has a four-year term. U.S. Representatives took office March 4 and have a two-year term.

References

Notes

Images
Hall of Governors Portrait Gallery; Portrait courtesy of Historical and Cultural Affairs, Dover

External links
Biographical Directory of the Governors of the United States
Biographical Directory of the United States Congress 

Delaware’s Governors
The Political Graveyard
Delaware Historical Society
University of Delaware Library

1821 births
1893 deaths
Methodists from Delaware
People from Middletown, Delaware
Wesleyan University alumni
Farmers from Delaware
American military personnel of the Mexican–American War
Governors of Delaware
Burials in Maryland
Democratic Party governors of Delaware
Delaware Whigs
Democratic Party members of the United States House of Representatives from Delaware
People from Cecil County, Maryland
19th-century American politicians
The Pennington School alumni